Camerota is an Italian surname.

List of people with the surname 

 Alfanus of Camerota, 12th century Italian priest
 Alisyn Camerota (born 1966), American journalist and television anchor
 Brett Camerota (born 1985), American Nordic combined skier
 Eric Camerota (born 1985), American Nordic combined skier
 Florius of Camerota, Italian political figure
 Remo Camerota, English-Australian visual artist and film director

See also 

 Camerota

Surnames
Italian-language surnames
Surnames of Italian origin